The Car Is on Fire is the self-titled debut album by Polish rock band The Car Is on Fire. It was released on May 21, 2005 through Pomaton EMI.

Percussion and guitars for this album, was recorded in June 2004, in KOSMOS studio (it was a studio before the first World War), in Warsaw. Vocals and additional effects was recorded also there and in the Adam Mickiewicz studio, in Sopot. Vocals in "Sexy" by Marta and Stefania from Cracow.

Track listing

Personnel
 Producer - TCIOF & Michał Baczuń
 Realisation - Michał Baczuń
 Mix - Jerzy Runowski, Michał Piwkowski
 Mastering - Grzegorz Piwkowski
 Additional producers - Maciej Cieślak
 Pictures: TCIOF - Sophie Thun, cat - Kuba Czubak, foot - Borys Dejnarowicz
 Cover design: TCIOF

References

2005 debut albums